Sulkava is a municipality of Finland. It is located in the Southern Savonia region.

Neighbouring municipalities are Juva, Puumala, Rantasalmi, Ruokolahti and Savonlinna.

The municipality is unilingually Finnish.

The municipality is best known for the annual long distance rowing contest, Sulkavan Suursoudut, around Partalansaari ("Partala Island") on lake Saimaa.

Notable people
Eila Pellinen
Kalevi Hämäläinen
Timo Rautiainen
Albin Savola

Gallery

References

External links

Municipality of Sulkava – Official website

Municipalities of South Savo
Populated places established in 1630
1630 establishments in Sweden